Leslie Aubrey Burton (15 October 1882 – 10 June 1946) was a British athlete. He competed at the 1908 Summer Olympics in London. He was born in Heswall, Merseyside died in Scarborough, North Yorkshire.

In the men's 400 metres hurdles, Burton won his first-round heat with a time of 1:00.4 to advance to the second round. There, he won again by establishing such a lead over the hurdles that he could not be caught in the straight. In the final, Burton finished last of the four runners, with a time of 58.0 seconds.

His daughter Elaine Burton, Baroness Burton of Coventry was a politician.

References

External links
Leslie Burton's profile at Sports Reference.com

1882 births
1946 deaths
Olympic athletes of Great Britain
Athletes (track and field) at the 1908 Summer Olympics
English male hurdlers
People from Heswall
Sportspeople from Wirral